Kamburu is a settlement in Kenya's Central Province.

References 
https://geographic.org/geographic_names/name.php?uni=-3103866&fid=3300&c=kenya

Kamburu is a Sub location within Gatamunyu Location, Lari district and in Kiambu County
The major economical activities is farming of tea leaves and main Cash crop and cow rearing.
Farmers are hard working and busy.
The major primary Schools in Kamburu Location includes
Kamburu Primary School
Gathima primary school
Nyamuthanga primary school

Another major feature is Ruiru Dam.
The  supplies Nairobi residents with a small portion of Water

Populated places in Central Province (Kenya)